Locomotive nos. 3 to 6 were early, German, four-coupled, tank engines designed for shunting duties with the Leipzig–Dresden Railway Company (Leipzig-Dresdner Eisenbahn or LDE).

History 
These four locomotives were delivered in 1874 by Wöhlert in Berlin to the LDE.

After the takeover of the LDE in 1876 by the Royal Saxon State Railways, the engines were incorporated into locomotive class W VII T. As well as being issued with the new numbers 628 to 631, they were given the names GRUBE, KUNST, BLENDE and CURVE. In 1892 they were renumbered 1407 to 1410. 

The locomotives were retired before 1916.

See also 
 Royal Saxon State Railways
 List of Saxon locomotives and railbuses
 Leipzig–Dresden Railway Company

Sources 

 
 

0-4-0T locomotives
Locomotives of Saxony
Railway locomotives introduced in 1874
Standard gauge locomotives of Germany

Shunting locomotives
Wöhlert locomotives